The ZEN is a portable media player designed and manufactured by Creative Technology. This flash memory-based player is the de facto successor of the ZEN Vision:M and was announced on August 29, 2007, to be available in capacities of 2, 4, 8, and 16 GB, as of September 14. A 32 GB model was announced on December 4, 2007, setting a record for storage capacity among flash players. The ZEN is referred to also by the identifier DVP-FL0001 though this does not appear on the unit.

Because of its dimensions, the ZEN is advertised to be the "size of a credit card". This is the first Creative player to have a SD card slot (enabling the support of SD and SDHC cards; an optional adapter is needed for microSD and miniSD cards), support for DRM free iTunes-encoded AAC (in a ".m4a" extension), as well as a truecolor TFT LCD display.

Specifications

SD card functionality 
The SD card acts as a separate storage volume with reduced features relative to the internal storage volume. SD card content does not appear under the regular menus Music, Artists, Albums, etc., appearing only on a separate "Memory Card" menu item which offers a folder-file browser. Add to Selected, Save As Playlist, Bookmarks etc. are unavailable for SD card content. Playlists stored on SD card cannot be played. This is considered poor by some reviewers expecting the SD card to function as an expansion of the internal storage. 

Though an Import All command makes copies of SD card tracks to internal memory, it fails to index them (even after Clean Up) hence leaving them completely inaccessible.

An advantage of SD card over internal storage is file transfer to the SD card does not require specialist software e.g. can be done by copy and paste from Windows Explorer, either to the card in a PC slot, or to the card in the player slot with the player connected by USB to PC whereupon the card is available as an MSC device.

Firmware releases 
Numerous firmware updates were released very soon after the player's launch, fixing a variety of bugs.

The earlier versions have reportedly caused players to occasionally result in a white screen of death.

Version 1.10.05 was released on October 23, 2007. Thai language support was added, while video playback was improved. Adapter charging and startup time were quickened.

The prior version, 1.20.02, was released on December 19, 2007. Transferring content via the SD card slot is enabled, though only image files are viewable.

Firmware version 1.21.01 was released on February 28, 2008. It improves the player's playback performance of WMA (.wma) files.

The latest version, 1.21.03, was released on January 19, 2009, which improves FM radio player operation.

Territory variants 
Units shipped in the EU after a certain date have a different variant of the firmware. The version number is suffixed by the letter "e" e.g. 1.21.01e, 1.21.03e.

In the "e" variant, the output level is reduced by approx 6dB i.e. at the maximum setting, 25, the volume is that of the non-"e" variant's setting 20. This is independent of Audio Settings' Restrict Volume. This variant appeared following an EU Commission proposal to address hearing health concerns by requiring a limit on music player output level. The two firmware variants are interchangeable, meaning the a unit's reduced limit may be removed by reprogramming with the non-"e" variant.

Undocumented features
Recovery Mode > Clean Up restores user settings to factory defaults, something that neither Recovery Mode > Format nor Windows Explorer Format does.

AAC Support
Creative states that the ZEN supports the AAC audio format. However, only iTunes-encoded files can be played by the player hardware. iTunes's implementation has been licensed by Apple from Dolby and is proprietary.  These files are in the .m4a format, which is the same as the Apple Lossless Audio Codec.  Creative has acknowledged this issue in a support article.

The latest version of Nero-AAC Encoder (1.3.3.0) "solved compatibility issues with some hardware devices", including ZEN. This update makes Nero-Coded AAC files playable on ZEN.

ZEN MX
The ZEN MX is a derivative of the ZEN launched in 2009. The form factor is similar to the ZEN's, being slightly less than a millimeter thicker at 11.9 mm (0.47 inches). There are a notable feature differences. The ZEN MX does not support .AVI, .MPG, or .AAC files natively. In order for them to be played back on the device, they must be transcoded using the bundled converter. The ZEN MX's button layout is slightly altered, merging the play/pause button with the power button. The ZEN MX extends importing from SD card to internal memory and library beyond the ZEN's picture import mode, adding music.  The ZEN MX features the MSC/UMS transfer system that makes the player compatible with Apple computers. The ZEN MX user interface is not as promptly responsive to button presses as the ZEN's.

Neither ZEN MX's nor ZEN's firmware can be installed on the other device.

See also 
 Creative ZEN
 Creative Technology
 Portable media player
 Comparison of portable media players

References

External links 
 Official product page (US)

Portable media players
Creative Technology products
Audiovisual introductions in 2007